Edmond Temelko is the former president of the Macedonian Alliance for European Integration. He has been mayor of the Pustec Municipality from local elections held in 2007 until 2019, before which he was councilor in the municipal council. He is an activist for Macedonian rights in Albania.

Activism 

In 2009 he gave a speech on the Albanian Radio-Television in Macedonian to increase the national awareness of the Macedonian people. According to Temelko,  Bulgaria uses heavy economic situation of Macedonians in Albania to offer them Bulgarian citizenship, passports and employment opportunity.

References 

People from Pustec
Mayors of places in Albania
Albanian people of Macedonian descent
Political party leaders of Albania
Year of birth missing (living people)
Living people
Place of birth missing (living people)